Disney Princess: The Ultimate Song Collection is a 2004 album that is a compilation of various Disney Princess songs, including the original song "If You Can Dream", that has since been featured on several other Disney compilation albums. It was released on September 21, 2004, by Walt Disney Records, and went on to peak at #4 on Billboard's Top Kid Audio chart.

Track listing
"If You Can Dream" - Lea Salonga, Judy Kuhn, Christie Hauser, Susan Stevens Logan, Paige O'Hara, and Jodi Benson (3:50)
"Part of Your World" - Jodi Benson (from The Little Mermaid) (3:14)
"A Whole New World" - Lea Salonga and Brad Kane (from Aladdin) (2:41)
"Just Around the Riverbend" - Judy Kuhn (from Pocahontas) (2:30)
"Colors of the Wind" - Judy Kuhn (from Pocahontas) (3:34)
"Someday My Prince Will Come" - Adriana Caselotti (from Snow White and the Seven Dwarfs) (1:54)
"So This Is Love" - Ilene Woods and Mike Douglas (from Cinderella) (1:32)
"A Dream is a Wish Your Heart Makes" - Ilene Woods (from Cinderella) (4:36)
"Once Upon a Dream" - Mary Costa and Bill Shirley (from Sleeping Beauty) (2:46)
"Can You Feel the Love Tonight" - Kristle Edwards, Joseph Williams, and Sally Dworsky (from The Lion King) (2:57)
"Belle" - Paige O'Hara, Richard White and Chorus (from Beauty and the Beast) (5:08)
"Reflection" - Lea Salonga (from Mulan) (2:26)
"Kiss the Girl" - Samuel E. Wright (from The Little Mermaid) (2:42)
"If You Can Dream" - Ashley Gearing (4:01)

See also
Walt Disney Records

References

External links
[ Disney Princess: The Ultimate Song Collection] at Allmusic

Ultimate Song Collection, The
Albums produced by Mark Mancina
2004 compilation albums
Pop compilation albums
Walt Disney Records compilation albums